The Diplomatic Quarter General Authority (DQGA), often shortened to Diplomatic Quarter Authority, was a short-lived planning authority that administered the Diplomatic Quarter district in Riyadh, Saudi Arabia between November 2018 and February 2021, independent from the supervision of Riyadh Municipality.

History 
The Diplomatic Quarter General Authority was established on November 27, 2018, through the Council of Ministers decision No. (165). In December 2018, the Council of Ministers outlined the organizational structure of the newly created authority, stipulating that the body would be bestowed with a financial and administrative independence besides being led by a board of directors and would responsible for its urban, cultural, social and historical development. In July 2019, the authority launched a blood donation campaign jointly with King Saud University in the Diplomatic Quarter. The DQGA organized the 'First Tuwaiq International Sculpture Gathering' in March 2019, in which countries like Italy, Albania, Germany, Bulgaria and Japan took part. In October 2019, the DQGA signed a strategic partnership agreement with a real estate development company in Saudi Arabia in order to build a commercial and entertainment complex. In November 2019, the DQGA signed a partnership agreement with the Saudi Golf Federation for the establishment of a golf course in the Diplomatic Quarter. In May 2020, DQGA signed a strategic partnership agreement with Dr. Sulaiman Al Habib Medical Group for the construction of a medical facility which would be developed and operated in the district. In July 2020, the DQGA signed a partnership with Tawal company for developing the infrastructure of the telecommunications sector in the district. In February 2021, the Council of Ministers passed a resolution which abolished the Diplomatic Quarter General Authority, whereby transferring its responsibilities to the Royal Commission for Riyadh City.

List of executives

References 

2018 establishments in Saudi Arabia
2021 disestablishments in Saudi Arabia
Government agencies of Saudi Arabia